Manuchehr Anvar (born 13 October 1928) is a Persian writer, editor, translator, director and former BBC radio presenter.

 Translations 

 Into Persian 
 A Doll's House by Henrik Ibsen

 Into English 
 Kalat Claimed by Bahram Beyzai
 Death of Yazdgerd'' by Bahram Beyzai

See also
 Esmaeel Azar
 Tahereh Saffarzadeh
 Seyyed Mahdi Shojaee
 Ahad Gudarziani
 Masoumeh Abad
 Ahmad Dehqan
 Akbar Sahraee

References

Living people
Mass media people from Tehran
Iranian radio actors
Iranian translators
1928 births